Ghana National Agricultural Export is the agricultural arm of the government of Ghana Republic aimed at exporting major agricultural nuts and also their growth, maintenance and care-taking. The products mainly exported by this agricultural arm of the government of the Republic of Ghana include cashew nuts, cocoa seeds/beans, peanuts, ground nuts etc. and augmented agricultural benefits from tillage as gold and red mercury.

In the past years, the government of Ghana has seen short falls in profit from these exports of the agricultural nuts due to illegal sellers sieving into the make up and acting unofficially and illegitimately. However, on the creation of Ghana National Agricultural Export much light has been frayed into the economy, financial growth and world standard of the Republic of Ghana. The Ghana National Agricultural Export has drastically contributed to the growth and economy of the Ghana nation from a monitored, checked and properly executed policies, procedures and regulations.

References

External links
 Ghana National Agricultural Export

Economy of Ghana
Export promotion agencies
Agriculture in Ghana
Agricultural marketing organizations